Juncus tiehmii is a species of rush known by the common name Nevada rush. It is native to the western United States, where it grows in wet habitat with granite sand substrate, including riverbanks and barren seeps. This is a small annual herb forming dense clumps of hair-thin stems no more than about 6 centimeters high. The inflorescence is made up of one to seven tiny flowers atop each stem. The flowers have a few greenish to pink or red segments no more than about 3 millimeters long.

External links
Jepson Manual Treatment
Photo gallery

tiehmii
Plants described in 1986
Flora of the Western United States
Flora without expected TNC conservation status